"Working for the Weekend" is a song by Canadian rock band Loverboy, from their second studio album, Get Lucky (1981). It was written by guitarist Paul Dean, vocalist Mike Reno and drummer Matt Frenette; and produced by Bruce Fairbairn and Dean. The song was released as the lead single from the album in October 1981. It has more of a power pop feel than the band's other songs, but this new sound proved to generate success; the song reached number 29 on the US Billboard Hot 100 chart, and number two on Billboards Mainstream Rock chart in January 1982.

"Working for the Weekend" is ranked number 100 on VH1's 100 Greatest Songs of the 80s.

Background
The song originated when guitarist Paul Dean was out walking one Wednesday afternoon, looking for inspiration in his songwriting. He noticed that much of the area was deserted, as most people were at work. "So I'm out on the beach and wondering, 'Where is everybody? Well, I guess they're all waiting for the weekend,'" he later said. Mike Reno, the band's vocalist, suggested they change the title to "Working for the Weekend". According to Dean, he first began writing the song in a hotel room following a Montreal concert. At the time, the band were still playing bars to little response from patrons. After completing the song, they used it to open one set, and Dean recalled that "the dance floor was packed".

Charts

Weekly charts

Year-end charts

Cover versions 
The song was covered by former American Idol contestant and country music singer Josh Gracin on the 2005 soundtrack to the final installment of the Herbie franchise, Herbie: Fully Loaded, starring Lindsay Lohan and Justin Long in the scene where the team works to fix Herbie overnight in time for the final race.
American virtuoso guitarist Paul Gilbert included an instrumental cover of this song as the first track on his 2014 album Stone Pushing Uphill Man.
Ron Burgundy (Will Ferrell) performed a parody version of the song on Conan on November 20, 2013, suggesting he had been asked by Rob Ford to cover the song as Ford's campaign song for re-election as Mayor of Toronto, the lyrics parodying Ford's ongoing substance abuse scandal.

In other media 
 The song was used in a 1990 Saturday Night Live sketch, "Chippendales Audition", in which Patrick Swayze and Chris Farley compete for a job as Chippendales dancers. The sketch's writer, Jim Downey described the song as a key inspiration for the sketch, stating that "nothing made [him] laugh more than the band Loverboy".
 The song was featured in a full length 1986 music video featuring Larry Bird and Magic Johnson promoting the Converse Weapons line of shoes.
 It was used in the 2001 film Zoolander, in a scene where Derek Zoolander works in a coal mine.
 It was used in the 2002 video game Grand Theft Auto: Vice City on the in-game radio station "V-Rock". It was also used in the video game Saints Row 2, on the 107.77 The Mix radio station. The song was also used in the 2005 video game compilation Namco Museum 50th Anniversary as one of the menu themes.
 It also featured in the 2006 film Click, featuring Adam Sandler; it was sung by Terry Crews while he sat in a traffic jam.
In 2006, in the Scrubs episode "My Half-Acre", Todd dances to the song when he auditions for the Janitor's air band.
 In 2010, Regular Show uses the song in the episode "Caffeinated Concert Tickets", where in a montage, Mordecai and Rigby drink the Coffee Bean's caffeine to stay up to do more chores and mow the lawn to get money for the Fist Pump concert.
 In 2014, the song was featured in the RadioShack Super Bowl XLVIII commercial "The '80s Called".
 In 2015, Pixels uses the song where Sam Brenner and Ludlow Lamonsoft fight off Centipede.
 In 2017, in the Family Guy episode "Don't Be a Dickens at Christmas", Peter dances with the ghost of Patrick Swayze to the song.
 The song was used to kick off the Friday afternoon "5 O'Clock Whistle" program on Z-100 in the mid-1980s.
 The song is playing in an elevator in the show Selfie. Henry, a workaholic, tries to use it as an example for Eliza about how great it is to work through the weekend. However, their coworkers explain that he misunderstands the song's meaning, that it's about working through the week so that one can rest during the weekend. Henry, disappointed, decides to delete the song from his playlist.
 Duff Goldman sang the song on The Masked Singer as "McTerrier" on March 9, 2022.

References 

1981 singles
1981 songs
1982 singles
Columbia Records singles
Epic Records singles
Loverboy songs
Power pop songs
Song recordings produced by Bruce Fairbairn
Songs about social issues
Songs written by Matt Frenette
Songs written by Mike Reno
Songs written by Paul Dean (guitarist)